Graeme Spinks (born 17 January 1961) is a New Zealand judoka. He competed at the 1984 Summer Olympics and the 1992 Summer Olympics. Spinks is a martial arts trainer in his birth-city Christchurch. He trained New Zealand Police in the use of force in self-defence, and restraint training, including carotid holds which can render a person unconscious within seconds; this choking method is rarely applied by Police.

References

External links
 

1961 births
Living people
New Zealand male judoka
Olympic judoka of New Zealand
Judoka at the 1984 Summer Olympics
Judoka at the 1992 Summer Olympics
Sportspeople from Christchurch
Commonwealth Games medallists in judo
Commonwealth Games silver medallists for New Zealand
Judoka at the 1990 Commonwealth Games
21st-century New Zealand people
20th-century New Zealand people
Medallists at the 1990 Commonwealth Games